= Excrescence =

Excrescence may refer to:

- Excrescence (phonology), the addition of a consonant to a word
- In medicine and physiology, an outgrowth, especially of this skin, such as occurs in carnosity
- Excrescence (architecture), a term defined by the architect Ruskin to mean an unpleasant addition to a building
